Carter is a town in Beckham County, Oklahoma, United States. The population was 256 at the 2010 census.

Geography
Carter is located at  (35.218187, -99.505054).

Carter is located at the intersection of State Highways 34 and 55. This intersection is the western terminus of SH-55.

Climate

Demographics

As of the census of 2000, there were 254 people, 114 households, and 68 families residing in the town. There were 136 housing units at an average density of 292.8 per square mile (114.2/km2). The racial makeup of the town was 85.83% White, 3.15% Native American, 8.27% from other races, and 2.76% from two or more races. Hispanic or Latino of any race were 11.42% of the population.

There were 114 households, out of which 26.3% had children under the age of 18 living with them, 47.4% were married couples living together, 9.6% had a female householder with no husband present, and 39.5% were non-families. 34.2% of all households were made up of individuals, and 15.8% had someone living alone who was 65 years of age or older. The average household size was 2.23 and the average family size was 2.90.

In the town, the population was spread out, with 21.3% under the age of 18, 11.4% from 18 to 24, 30.7% from 25 to 44, 22.8% from 45 to 64, and 13.8% who were 65 years of age or older. The median age was 37 years. For every 100 females, there were 96.9 males. For every 100 females age 18 and over, there were 102.0 males.

The median income for a household in the town was $21,250, and the median income for a family was $26,250. Males had a median income of $20,125 versus $16,500 for females. The per capita income for the town was $17,216. About 24.2% of families and 28.9% of the population were below the poverty line, including 52.1% of those under the age of eighteen and 28.1% of those 65 or over.

References

External links
 Encyclopedia of Oklahoma History and Culture - Carter

Towns in Beckham County, Oklahoma
Towns in Oklahoma